Vintilă of Wallachia was the son of Pătrașcu cel Bun. He briefly ruled Wallachia in May 1574.

|-

Rulers of Wallachia
16th-century rulers in Europe
Year of birth unknown
Year of death unknown
History of Wallachia (1512–1714)